Bardan may refer to:
Bardan, Iran, a village in West Azerbaijan Province, Iran
Bardan, Khuzestan, a village in Khuzestan Province, Iran
Seh Bardan, a village in Iran
Bardan Monastery, a Buddhist monastery in India
Ștefan Bardan (1892–?), Romanian Major-General during World War II